Airén is a variety of Vitis vinifera, a white grape commonly used in winemaking. This grape is native to Spain where it represents almost a quarter of all grapes grown. Since Airén tends to be planted at a low density, several other varieties (including Cabernet Sauvignon and Merlot) are more planted in terms of number of vines.

Description
The grapes have a cotton-like bud burst, which is bronze or yellowish in colour, with light reddish edge, and not very intense at the tip. The grapes have a trailing growing habit. The leaves of the Airén are average in size and have a pentagonal shape. The lower lateral sinuses are less marked than the upper ones and the upper face of the leaf is yellowish green in color while the lower face is velvety. The grape bunch is large in size and has an average compactness. It can grow in two different shapes: cylindrical or as a long cone. The grapes are large and spherical and have a yellowish color. The grapes are late to bud burst and also late to ripen. They yield about 4.5 to 6 kg per vine. Further, this grape is very resistant to drought and the base buds are fertile and thus resists very short pruning and still have acceptable yields.

History

The first recorded mention of Airén was in 1615. In the 15th century it was known as Lairén (as it is in the Córdoba region today) and is cited as such in Gabriel Alonso de Herrera’s “Agricultura General”. This author however preferred to call it “Datileña” because the grapes were bunched together like dates. He confesses to not having tasted the wine but states that “it is not very strong nor does it have much body” and also that “it would be better to make raisins from these grapes as they are very  shapely and abundant”.

In 1807, Roxas Clemente describes two types of Layrén: the first is the one we know today as the modern Airén from La Mancha and second is a table grape as described by Herrera as the Datileña. The first reference by Roxas Clemente mentions that Airén is also known as Mantúo Laerén and Laerén de Rey. He describes this variety as follows:

He says that this variety is grown in Sanlúcar, Xerez, Trebujena, Arcos, Espera, Moguer, Tarifa and Paxarete. He also mentions that it is grown in Valdepeñas and Manzanares, where it gives excellent wines for the production of exquisite spirits. The second reference by Roxas Clemente to Layrén states that this variety is synonymous to the Datileña. He describes it as:
 This grape, according to Roxas Clemente, is used for the production of raisins and to mix its must with that of the Ximénez variety, and in 1807 was grown in Sanlúcar, Xerez, Trebujena, Algeciras, Arcos, Espera, Moguer, Málaga, Motril, Albuñol, Adra y Paxarete.

In 1885, Abela stated that Mantúo Laerén, apart from the areas mentioned by Roxas Clemente, was also grown in the region of Córdoba (known there as Mantúo Lairén) and in the areas around Cáceres, Ciudad Real, Málaga, Sevilla and Toledo, where it was known as Lairén.

In 1914, García de los Salmones mentioned the cultivation of Lairén in Madrid, Villacañas (Toledo), Tarancón (Cuenca), Campo de Criptana (Ciudad Real), Frejenal de la Sierra (Badajoz), Montefrío (Granada), Baeza (Jaén), Coin (Málaga), Fiñana (Almería), Cazalla de la Sierra (Sevilla), Espera (Cádiz) and Córdoba. And as Airén in Albacete.

In 1954, Marcilla defined the Airén variety as a typical vine in the La Mancha region, grown almost exclusively in that area. He described it as a 
 Of the wine made from these grapes he states:

He also mentions Lairén as being grown in Montilla (Córdoba) and in Extremadura.

In 1965, Fernández de Bobadilla described Mantúo Laerén as:
 He says the following about its agronomic properties: 

In 1976, Hidalgo described Airén as follows:

In the "Inventario Vitícola Nacional" by Hidalago and Rodríguez Candela (1971) Airén is cited as growing in Ciudad Real, Cuenca, Madrid, Málaga y Toledo. As Lairén is cited as growing in Córdoba, Jaén y Sevilla. As Valdepeñera or Airén grown in Albacete.

In Jancis Robinson’s "Guía de Uvas para Vinificación" (1996) Airén is cited as the most grown variety of grape in the world: with 423.100 ha under cultivation, it exceeds Garnacha (Grenache) with 317.500 ha, Mazuelo with 244.330 ha, Ugni blanc with 203.400 ha, Merlot with 162.200 ha and Cabernet Sauvignon with 146.200 ha. She comments that it is the most common variety in Spain, comprising 30% of all vines. It is absolutely dominant in the Valdepeñas area and in La Mancha. She also comments that in the south of Spain it is known as Lairén.

In his book "Cepas del Mundo" (1997), José Peñín gives the origin of Airén as being in La Mancha, from where two thirds of all the grapes grown in Spain come from. It is absolutely the dominant variety in this region, especially so in Ciudad Real and Toledo, and slightly less so in Albacete and Cuenca. It can also be found further south in Montilla-Moriles. Peñín describes the wine made from Airén as follows:

Peñín goes on to comment on the agronomic characteristics: 

From this bibliography, it can be observed that two types of Airén (Lairén or Layrén) are described: one is the variety extensively grown in La Mancha and which is cited in the first reference by Clemente, by Abela, by García de los Salmones, by Marcilla, by Hidalgo, by Jancis Robinson, and by Peñín. The second type of Airén (Layrén or Datileña) is a table grape used to produce raisins and which is described by Alonso de Herrera, in the second reference by Clemente, and by Fernández de Bobadilla. The first mention of the name Airén (currently the most widely used denomination to define this variety) is in the citation by García de los Salmones (1914) in the province of Albacete.

Regions
Airén is by far the most abundant in the Valdepeñas and La Mancha DOs, very abundant in the provinces of Ciudad Real, Toledo, and only slightly less so in Albacete and Cuenca. The low vine density of Airén in La Mancha has led to it being the known as the largest area, planted to a single grape variety, in the world It can also be found significantly in Madrid and as far south as Montilla-Moriles.

Viticulture and uses
Airén is allowed in the following DOs: Alicante, Bullas, Jumilla, La Mancha, Valdepeñas and Vinos de Madrid. As Layrén it is allowed in Montilla-Moriles.

The Airén vine is commonly planted in unusually low vine density, around 1500 vines per hectare, which has a deleterious effect on wine quality as with any grape variety. Its vineyards cover vast areas but as trends in Spanish wine production move towards red wine, a huge number of Airéns vines are being uprooted, not least because the grape often produces an acidic and characterless wine, such as the wines produced from La Mancha's Airén vines. Due to the anonymous nature of Airén wines, its principal use has generally been in the manufacture of Spanish  brandy.

Synonyms
Airén is also known under the synonyms Aiden, Blancon, Forcallada, Forcallat, Forcallat blanca, Forcallat blanco, Forcayat, Forcellat bianca, Forcellat blanca, Laeren del Rey, Lairen, Layren, Manchega, Mantuo Laeren, Valdepenas, Valdepenera blanca, and Valdepenero.

References

White wine grape varieties
Grape varieties of Spain
Spanish wine